Edwin Groves (1900 – after 1929) was an English footballer who played in The Football League for Walsall. Born in Walsall, he also played for Talbot Stead Tube Works, Shrewsbury Town and Wellington Town.

References

1900 births
Year of death missing
Sportspeople from Walsall
Association football utility players
English footballers
Talbot Stead F.C. players
Walsall F.C. players
Shrewsbury Town F.C. players
Telford United F.C. players
English Football League players
Association football fullbacks
Association football wing halves
Association football forwards
Association football central defenders